The Rolling Stones' 1964 1st British Tour was a concert tour. The tour commenced on 6 January and concluded on 27 January 1964. They played two shows a day at all venues.

Tour band
Mick Jagger - lead vocals, harmonica, percussion
Keith Richards - guitar, backing vocals
Brian Jones - guitar, harmonica, backing vocals
Bill Wyman - bass guitar, backing vocals
Charlie Watts - drums

Tour set list
"Girls"
"Come On"
"Mona"
"You Better Move On"
"Roll Over Beethoven"
"I Wanna Be Your Man"
"Money"
"Memphis Tennessee"
"Pretty Thing"
"I Can Tell"
"Road Runner"
"Bye Bye Johnny"

Tour dates

References
 Carr, Roy.  The Rolling Stones: An Illustrated Record.  Harmony Books, 1976.  

The Rolling Stones concert tours
1964 concert tours
1964 in the United Kingdom
January 1964 events in the United Kingdom
Concert tours of the United Kingdom